The 2020 United States presidential election in California was held on Tuesday, November 3, 2020, as part of the 2020 United States presidential election in which all 50 states plus the District of Columbia participated. California voters chose electors to represent them in the Electoral College via a popular vote, pitting the Republican Party's nominee, incumbent President Donald Trump, and running mate Vice President Mike Pence against Democratic Party nominee, former Vice President Joe Biden, and his running mate Kamala Harris, the junior senator from California. California had, in the 2020 election 55 electoral votes in the Electoral College, the most of any state. Prior to the election, most news organizations considered California a strongly Democratic state, or a safe blue state. It has voted Democratic in every presidential election from 1992 onward. California was one of seven states where Trump received more percentage of the two-party  vote than he did in 2016. This election also marked the first time since 2004 that the Republican candidate won more than one million votes in Los Angeles County, due to increased turnout statewide.

Biden carried California with 63.5% of the vote and a margin of 29.2% over Trump. Biden earned the highest percentage of the vote in the state for any candidate since Franklin D. Roosevelt in 1936, although Biden's margin of victory was slightly smaller than Hillary Clinton's 30.1% in 2016, making it one of just seven states in which Trump improved on his 2016 margin. Biden became the first candidate in any race for any office in U.S. history to win more than 10 million votes in a single state, while Trump also received the most votes a Republican has ever received in any state in any race since the country's founding, even narrowly besting his vote total in Texas, a state that he won. Biden's vote margin was the largest vote margin for a presidential candidate in a singular state.

Per exit polls by Edison Research, Biden dominated key Democratic constituencies in the state including Latinos with 75%, African Americans with 82%, Asian Americans with 76%, and union households with 63%. Post-election analysis by Cook Political Report showed Trump made inroads with some Asian American constituencies, particularly Vietnamese American voters in Orange County. 

Biden flipped Butte County and Inyo County into the Democratic column, which had not voted Democratic since 2008 and 1964, respectively. Biden's victory in Orange County was only the second time a Democrat carried the county since 1936. In contrast, while he improved his total vote share by nearly three percentage points, Trump did not flip any counties and his main regions of strength came from Republican strongholds in Gold Country, Shasta Cascade, and parts of the Central Valley. California Secretary of State Alex Padilla certified the results on December 4, and took Harris's seat in the Senate upon her resignation to become Vice President, having been appointed by Governor Gavin Newsom.

California was one of five states in the nation in which Biden's victory margin was larger than 1 million raw votes, the others being New York, Maryland, Massachusetts and Illinois. Over 5 million votes of Biden's 7 million vote lead nationwide were Californian votes.

Primary elections
In a departure from previous election cycles, California held its primaries on Super Tuesday, March 3, 2020. Early voting began several weeks earlier.

Donald Trump secured the Republican nomination on March 17, 2020, defeating several longshot candidates, most notably former Massachusetts Governor Bill Weld. Kamala Harris, the state's junior U.S. senator, was among the Democratic candidates declared until she dropped out on December 3, 2019. Representative Eric Swalwell from the 15th district was also a Democratic candidate but dropped out of the race on July 8, 2019. Other prominent state figures, including former Governor Jerry Brown, current Governor Gavin Newsom, and Los Angeles Mayor Eric Garcetti declined to run.

Republican primary

The Republican Party's primary campaign was dominated by a lawsuit over the President's taxes. The suit alleges that the new requirement for several years of a candidate's taxes was unconstitutional and onerous. The law was blocked in September 2019 while State Supreme court heard testimony and made a ruling.

As a contingency, the Republican state committee changed its delegate selection process, turning the primary into a mere "beauty contest" and setting up an emergency state convention to Trump's delegate choices. If Trump were allowed on the ballot, the convention would be canceled and the so-called "winner-take-most" rules, which require a challenger to get 20% of the vote, would apply.

Incumbent Trump was allowed on the ballot, and the contingency convention was canceled.

Democratic primary

Candidates began filing their paperwork on November 4, 2019, and the final list was announced on December 9.

Leading California Democrats complained that Joe Biden and Senator Elizabeth Warren were snubbing the state by refusing to attend a forum at the State's "endorsement convention". Early voting began on February 11 and ended the day before primary day.

Libertarian primary

The Libertarian Party of California permitted non-affiliated voters to vote in their presidential primary.

Green primary

American Independent primary
The American Independent Party permitted non-affiliated voters to vote in their presidential primary.

Peace and Freedom primary

General election

Final predictions

Polling
Graphical summary

Aggregate polls

Polls

with Donald Trump and Bernie Sanders

with Donald Trump and Tulsi Gabbard

with Donald Trump and Elizabeth Warren

with Donald Trump and Michael Bloomberg

with Donald Trump and Amy Klobuchar

with Donald Trump and Pete Buttigieg

with Donald Trump and Tom Steyer

with Donald Trump and Deval Patrick

with Donald Trump and Andrew Yang

with Donald Trump and Cory Booker

with Donald Trump and Kamala Harris

with Donald Trump and Beto O'Rourke

with Donald Trump and Kirsten Gillibrand

with Donald Trump and Jerry Brown

with Donald Trump and Sherrod Brown

with Donald Trump and Eric Garcetti

with Donald Trump and Tom Hanks

with Donald Trump and Eric Holder

with Donald Trump and Mitch Landrieu

with Donald Trump and Michelle Obama

with Donald Trump and Oprah Winfrey

with Donald Trump and Mark Zuckerberg

with Mike Pence and Joe Biden

with Mike Pence and Michael Bloomberg

with Mike Pence and Pete Buttigieg

with Mike Pence and Bernie Sanders

with Mike Pence and Elizabeth Warren

with Nikki Haley and Joe Biden

with Nikki Haley and Pete Buttigieg

with Nikki Haley and Bernie Sanders

with Nikki Haley and Elizabeth Warren

with Mike Pence and Kamala Harris

with Mike Pence and Beto O'Rourke

with Nikki Haley and Kamala Harris

with Nikki Haley and Beto O'Rourke

Results
Biden won California with a smaller margin of victory than Hillary Clinton in 2016. Nevertheless, he performed well in most urban areas of the state. Biden is also the first candidate for any statewide race in American history to receive over ten million votes.

Results by county

Counties that flipped from Republican to Democratic
Inyo (largest municipality: Bishop)
Butte (largest municipality: Chico)

By congressional district 
Biden won 46 of the 53 congressional districts in California, including four that were flipped or held by Republicans in Congress.

Analysis 
Despite Biden's overall victory closely mirroring Clinton's, under a point behind her margin, there were large swings underneath the statewide margins. Biden lost ground in large diverse counties, while improving in mostly whiter and more suburban counties. Trump improved his standing in Los Angeles County, thanks to growth in mainly Latino neighborhoods in the Gateway Cities and the San Fernando Valley alongside improvements in mainly Asian communities in the San Gabriel Valley. Trump also managed to gain in white neighborhoods as well, with visible gains made in Beverly Hills and other Westside communities, Burbank and Glendale in the eastern San Fernando Valley, and the Valley's southern wealthy neighborhoods such as Encino and Tarzana. Biden also saw his margins fall in Santa Clara County in the Silicon Valley, home to one of the largest concentrations of Asian Americans in the country. His margins slightly shrank in the more suburban communities of Santa Clara and Sunnyvale, even improving in very wealthy cities like Los Altos Hills and Saratoga, but his margins dramatically collapsed in the heavily Asian parts of San Jose and Milpitas, as Trump's comparison of Biden to Socialism and Communism during the campaign drove Vietnamese-American voters towards him. Trump also gained in Alameda and San Francisco County, but his improvements were smaller than Santa Clara County and Los Angeles County. Meanwhile, Biden gained in the more white and suburban San Diego County and Riverside County. In the former, Biden's improvements in wealthy suburban areas, like Carlsbad and Encinitas, alongside gains in more working-class Escondido and Oceanside, helped overcome Trump's growth in the more Hispanic neighborhoods in southern San Diego County. In Riverside County, Trump lost ground in whiter more Republican territory in the southern part of the county like Menifee and Temecula, and in very liberal communities like Palm Springs in the Coachella Valley, which overcame Biden's decline in Hispanic communities towards the county's northwest, including Moreno Valley and Perris.

Outside the large population centers and the Inland Empire, both parties largely ran in line with their 2016 performances. In the Central Valley, Biden's margin was roughly unchanged, though he lost some support in the northern counties like Merced and Stanislaus while gaining in the more Republican southern counties around Kern (Bakersfield). Biden improved by a point in Sacramento County, but saw visible growth in suburban Placer County. However, Trump overwhelmingly outperformed his 2016 performance in rural and heavily Hispanic Imperial County, gaining 17%.

See also
 United States presidential elections in California
 2020 California elections
 2020 United States presidential election
 2020 Democratic Party presidential primaries
 2020 Republican Party presidential primaries
 2020 Libertarian Party presidential primaries
 2020 Green Party presidential primaries
 2020 United States elections

Notes

References

Further reading
 

California
2020
Presidential